Italian Tunisians (or Italians of Tunisia) are Tunisians of Italian descent. Migration and colonization, particularly during the 19th century, led to significant numbers of Italians settling in Tunisia.

Italian presence in Tunisia
The presence of a numerous community of Italians in Tunisia has ancient origins, but it is only from the first half of the 19th century that its economic and social weight became critical in many fields of the social life of the country.

The Republic of Genoa owned the island of Tabarka near Biserta, where the Genoese family Lomellini, who had purchased the grant of the coral fishing from the Ottoman Turks, maintained a garrison from 1540 to 1742. Here may still be seen the ruins of a stronghold, a church and some Genoese buildings. At Tabarka the ruins consist of a pit once used as a church and some fragments of walls which belonged to Christian buildings.

Italian Jews from Livorno created the first foreign community in Tunisia, after the 16th century.  In those centuries, the Italian language became the lingua franca in the field of the commerce in the Maghreb.

The first Italians in Tunisia at the beginning of the 19th century were mainly traders and professionals in search of new opportunities, coming from Liguria and the other regions of northern Italy.  In those years even a great number of Italian political exiles (related to Giuseppe Mazzini and the Carbonari organizations) were forced into expatriation in Tunisia, in order to escape the political oppression enacted by the preunitary States of the Italian peninsula. One of them was Giuseppe Garibaldi, in 1834 and 1849.

In a move that foreshadowed the Triple alliance, Italian colonial interests in Tunisia were actually encouraged by the Germans and Austrians in the late 19th century to offset French interests in the region and to retain a perceived balance of power in Europe. The Austrians also had an interest in diverting Italy's attention away from the Trentino.

At the end of the 19th century, Tunisia received the immigration of tens of thousands of Italians, mainly from Sicily and also Sardinia. As a consequence, in the first years of the 20th century there were more than 100,000 Italian residents in Tunisia. They concentrated not only in Tunis, Biserta, La Goulette, and Sfax, but even in small cities like Zaghouan, Bouficha, Kelibia, and Ferryville.

In those years, the Italian community was the main European community in the French Protectorate: Sicilians made up 72.5% of the community's population, while 16.3% were from central Italy (mainly Tuscan Jews), 3.8% were Sardinians and 2.5% from northern Italy (mainly from Veneto and Emilia).

The small city of La Goulette (called La Goletta by the Italian Tunisians) was practically developed by Italian immigrants in the 19th century, who constituted nearly half the population until the 1950s (the international actress Claudia Cardinale was born there in 1938).

The presence of the Italians was fundamental in the process of cultural modernization of the country with the creation of various schools and institutes of culture, with the foundation of newspapers and reviews in Italian language and with the construction of hospitals, roads and small manufacturing industries, supported by Italian financial institutions.

The British Encyclopedia states that "...after 1862, however, the kingdom of Italy began to take a deep interest in the future of Tunisia. When the country went bankrupt in 1869, a triple control was established over Tunisian finances, with British, French and Italian controllers.' In 1880 the Italians bought the British railway from Tunis to Goletta. This and other actions excited the French to act on the secret understanding effected with the British foreign minister at the Berlin Congress. In 1881 a French force crossed the Algerian frontier under pretext of chastising the independent Khmir tribes on the north-east of the regency, and, quickly dropping the mask, advanced on the capital and compelled the Bey to accept the French protectorate. The actual conquest of the country was not effected without a serious struggle with the existing Muslim population, especially at Sfax; but all Tunisia was brought completely under French jurisdiction and administration, supported by military posts at every important point. In 1883 the new situation under the French protectorate was recognized by the British government withdrawing its consular jurisdiction in favour of the French courts, and in 1885 it ceased to be represented by a diplomatic official. The other powers followed suit, except Italy, which did not recognize the full consequences of the French protectorate until 1896..."

On 30 September 1896, Italy and France signed a treaty whereby Italy virtually recognised Tunisia as a French dependency.

France and the Peril Italien

The French conquest of Tunisia in 1881, the so-called Schiaffo di Tunisi, created many problems to the Tunisian Italians, who were seen as Le Peril Italien (the Italian danger) by the French colonial rulers.

In Tunisian cities (like Tunis, Biserta and La Goulette) there were highly populated quarters called “Little Sicily” or “Little Calabria”. Italian schools, religious institutions, orphanages and hospitals were opened. The prevailing Italian presence in Tunisia, at both the popular and entrepreneurial level, was such that France set in motion with its experienced diplomacy and its sound entrepreneurial sense the process which led to the "Treaty of Bardo" and a few years later the Conventions of La Marsa, which rendered Tunisia a Protectorate of France in 1881.

In this way France began its policy of economic and cultural expansion in Tunisia, opening free schools, spreading the French language and allowing, on request, French citizenship to foreign residents. Some Sicilians become French: in the 1926 Census there were 30,000 French "of foreign language" in Tunisia.  For example, attending free French schools, Mario Scalesi, the son of poor Sicilian emigrants, became a French speaker and in French wrote Les poèmes d’un maudit ("The poems of one damned") and was thus the first francophone poet from the Maghreb.

Even under the Protectorate the emigration of Italian workers to Tunisia continued unabated. Scalesi pinpointed that in 1910 there were 105,000 Italians in Tunisia, as against 35,000 Frenchmen, but there were only 1,167 holders of land among the former, with an aggregate of 83,000 hectares, whereas the Frenchmen include 2,395 landowners who had grabbed 700,000 hectares in the colony. A French decree of 1919 made the acquisition of real estate property practically prohibitive to the Tunisian Italians and this French attitude toward the Italians paved the way for the Mussolini's complaints in the 1920s and 1930s.

With the rise of Benito Mussolini, the contrasts between Rome and Paris were sharpened also because the Italians of Tunisia showed themselves to be very sensitive to the fascist propaganda and many of them joined in compact form the nationalistic ideals of the Fascism of the "Duce".

Indeed, the Tunisian Italians showed "to be defiantly nationalistic and robustly resistant to amalgamation" and many of them refused - in many cases vehemently - to be naturalized by the French authorities.

Fascist requests after 1938

The fact that the French government promoted actively the French citizenship between the Italians in Tunisia was one of the main reasons of the direct intervention of Mussolini in the Tunisian problems. From 1910 to 1926, the Italians were reduced by this French policy of assimilation from 105,000 to less than 90,000.

In the 1926 census of the Tunisian colony, there were 173,281 Europeans, of which 89,216 were Italians, 71,020 French and 8,396 Maltese. Indeed, this was a relative majority that made Laura Davi (in his "Memoires italiennes en Tunisie" of 1936) write that "La Tunisia è una colonia italiana amministrata da funzionari francesi" (Tunisia is an Italian colony administered by French managers).

Initially, during the 1920s, Fascism promoted only the defense of the national and social rights of the Italians of Tunisia against the tentative of amalgamation done by France. Mussolini opened some financial institutions and Italian Banks (like the Banca siciliana) and some Italian newspapers (like L'Unione), but even Italian hospitals, teachers, cinemas, schools (primary and secondary) and health assistance organizations.

The March of Times (documentary of Time magazine) in 1939 stated that "...With 1 million trained soldiers and its powerful navy, Italy is in a position to execute its plan for Mediterranean conquest. Of all Mediterranean plums, none is so tempting to land-hungry Italy as France's North African protectorate—Tunisia. For nearly 60 years, Tunisia was reasonably contented. The country is fertile—a major producer of olive oil and fertilizer, it may also have oil. Tunisia has strategic importance in a major Mediterranean war and could make Rome again master of this sea.The French employ a Muslim figurehead, who, in return for his keep, is supposed to ensure that the Muslim population is content. The fascist imperial state of Italy has sent advance men sent into Tunisia, so that there are more Italians in French Tunisia than in all African colonies. Well supplied with fascist funds, Italy's consuls and their agents have long been busy systematically undermining French influence of authority. Italian banks are generous to Italian colonists, Italians have their own schools loyal to the fascist state of Italy, and many Tunisian newspapers are subsidized by Italy. Professional agitators are actively encouraging trouble, magnifying grievances, imaginary or real. Radio programs tell Muslims that Mussolini alone is their protector. Membership in the Fascist Party is all but compulsory for every Italian male in Tunisia, and refusing to join means virtual banishment. Granted free speech and free assembly by French law, fascist leaders in Tunisia have become loud and aggressive in demanding special privileges for Italians, at the same time denouncing the French government, which tolerates their activities. Italy is making buildings that are easily convertible to military use, and building up the civil population to support a mass takeover..."

In 1940, Mussolini requested France to give Tunisia (along with Djibouti, Corsica and Nice) to Italy, when World War II was just beginning. However it was only in November 1942 that Italian troops occupied (with Rommel's help) Tunisia and seized it from the Vichy regime.

Fourth Shore

Indeed it wasn't until the end of 1942 that Italian troops seized Tunisia, with German Field Marshal Rommel's Afrika Korps troop support, from the Vichy French regime colonial administrators.

Tunisia was added administratively to the existing northern Italian Libya Fourth Shore, in Mussolini's last attempt to accomplish the fascist project of Imperial Italy. In the first months of 1943 Italian schools in Tunis and Biserta were opened, while 4000 Italian Tunisians volunteered in the Italian Army. Also some Italian newspapers and magazines were reopened, that had been closed by the French government in the late 1930s.

In the last months of 1942 some Tunisians and local Italians did even join the National Fascist Party in Tunis. From December 1942 until February 1943 Tunisia and Italian Libya were under Italian control and administered as "Africa Settentrionale Italiana", but later the Allies conquered all Italian Tripolitania and Italian control was reduced to the Tunisian area west of the Mareth Line (where an Axis last stand was fought).

All legally established territory of Italian North Africa was dissolved by early 1943, but Tunisia remained the last de facto Italian administered territory until all Tunisia fell to American and British forces. In May 1943 
Tunisia administratively was added to Italy's Fourth Shore (in Italian Quarta Sponda) with Libya, in the last tentative attempt to realise Mussolini's project of Imperial Italy.

Some Tunisian Italians participated in the Italian Army, but, in May 1943, the Allies conquered all Tunisia and the French authorities closed all the Italian schools and newspapers. From that moment the Italians were harassed by the French regime and so started a process of disappearance of the Italian community in Tunisia. This process was successively aggravated in the 1950s by the war of independence of the Tunisian Arabs against France.

In the 1946 census, the Italians in Tunisia were 84,935, but in 1959 (3 years after many Italian settlers left to Italy or France after independence from France) there were only 51,702, and in 1969 there were less than 10,000. As of 2005, there are only 900, mainly concentrated in the metropolitan area of Tunis. Another 2,000 Italians, according to the Italian Embassy in Tunis, are "temporary" residents, working as professionals and technicians for Italian companies in different areas of Tunisia.

Legacy

The legacy of the Italians in Tunisia is extensive. It goes from the construction of roads and buildings to literature and gastronomy (many Tunisian dishes are heavily influenced by the Sicilian gastronomy).

The city of La Goletta was practically created by Sicilian immigrants during the 19th century, with a quarter called "Piccola Sicilia" (Little Sicily, or "Petite Sicile" in French).

In 1926 there were 2,449 Italians living in this city near Tunis (40,8% of a total population of 5,997), while the French population only numbered 772.

The Italian international actress Claudia Cardinale, famous for the 1968 movie Once Upon a Time in the West of Sergio Leone, was born in La Goletta in 1938.

Even the Tunisian language has many words borrowed from the Italian language. For example, "fatchatta" from Italian "facciata" (facade), "trino" from Italian "treno" (train), "miziria" from Italian "miseria" (misery), "jilat" from Italian "gelato" (ice cream), "guirra" from Italian "guerra" (war), etc....

Language and religion

Most Italian Tunisians speak Tunisian Arabic, French, and any of the languages of Italy (especially Italian, Sicilian and Neapolitan), while the assimilated ones speak Tunisian Arabic and French only. In religion, most are Roman Catholic Christians.

Italian Tunisians
Small list of notable Tunisians of Italian descent:
 Loris Azzaro, international designer
 Claude Bartolone, former president of the French National Assembly
 Sandra Milo, international actress
 Claudia Cardinale, international actress
 Paul G. Comba, computer scientist and astronomer
 Niccolò Converti, politician and editor
 Antonio Corpora, painter
 Laura Davi, writer
 Cesare Luccio, writer
 Carlos Marcello, American Mafia don (Born in Tunis)
 Attilio Molco, lawyer and founder of the Tunisian "Dante Alighieri".
 Nicola Pietrangeli, international tennis champion
 , poet and writer.

See also
 Kingdom of Africa
 Republic of Genoa
 Italian Empire
 Tunisian Campaign
 Italy–Tunisia relations

References

Bibliography
 Alberti Russell, Janice. The Italian community in Tunisia, 1861-1961: a viable minority. Columbia University. Columbia, 1977.
 Bellahsen,Fabien, Daniel Rouche et Didier Bizos. Cuisine de Tunisie Ed. Auzou. Paris, 2005
 Bonura, Francesco. Gli Italiani in Tunisia ed il problema della naturalizzazione. Luce Ed. Roma, 1929
 Foerster, Robert. The Italian Emigration of Our Times. Ayer Publishing. Manchester (New Hampshire), 1969. 
 Iiams, Thomas M. (1962). Dreyfus, Diplomatists and the Dual Alliance: Gabriel Hanotaux at the Quai D'Orsay (1894 - 1898), Geneva/Paris: Librairie Droz/Librairie Minard
 Mion, Giuliano. Osservazioni sul sistema verbale dell'arabo di Tunisi. Rivista degli Studi Orientali 78. Roma, 2004.
 Moustapha Kraiem. Le fascisme et les italiens de Tunisie, 1918-1939. Cahiers du CERES. Tunis, 1969
 Priestley, Herbert. France Overseas: Study of Modern Imperialism. Routledge. Kentucky, 1967.  
 Sebag, Paul. Tunis. Histoire d'une ville ed. L'Harmattan, Paris, 1998
 Smeaton Munro, Ion. Through Fascism to World Power: A History of the Revolution in Italy.Ayer Publishing. Manchester (New Hampshire), 1971. 
 Watson, Bruce Allen. Exit Rommel: The Tunisian Campaign, 1942-43. Stackpole Military History Series. Mechanicsburg, PA: Stackpole Books (1999). .

External links
 Image of Genoese Tabarca
 Italian newspaper of Tunisia
 Photo of the "Petite Sicile" of la Goletta (La Goulette), with the local Catholic church
 Website of the Italians of Tunisia
 A tribute to Claudia Cardinale
 How the French preceded the Italians in the occupation of Tunisia (in Italian)
 Tunisia in the British Encyclopedia

 
Social history of Tunisia
 
Tunisia
Tunisians
Italy–Tunisia relations